Ahmed Suhail Saber Al-Hamawende (born 8 February 1999) is a Qatari footballer with Iraqi origins. He currently plays for Al-Sadd as a defender.

Personal life
Suhail is the son of former Iraqi national team goalkeeper Suhail Saber. His brother is Rami Suhail who is a football player that has also been naturalised by Qatar.

Club 
Al-Sadd
Qatar Cup: 2021

References

 Ahmed Suhail - KOOORA.com

1999 births
Living people
Qatari footballers
Qatar youth international footballers
Al Sadd SC players
Al Ahli SC (Doha) players
Al-Wakrah SC players
Al-Arabi SC (Qatar) players
Qatar Stars League players
2021 CONCACAF Gold Cup players
Qatari people of Iraqi descent
Naturalised citizens of Qatar
Association football defenders
Qatar under-20 international footballers